Almetyevsk (Älmät) is a city in the Republic of Tatarstan, Russia, located on the left bank of the Zay River (Kama's tributary)  southeast of Kazan. Population:    77,000 (1969); 49,000 (1959). Unofficial cycling capital of Russia.

History
Almetyevsk is one of the youngest cities in the republic.

Administrative and municipal status
Within the framework of administrative divisions, Almetyevsk serves as the administrative center of Almetyevsky District, even though it is not a part of it. As an administrative division, it is incorporated separately as the city of republic significance of Almetyevsk—an administrative unit with the status equal to that of the districts. As a municipal division, the city of republic significance of Almetyevsk is incorporated within Almetyevsky Municipal District as Almetyevsk Urban Settlement.

Cycling capital of Russia 
Almetyevsk has created highly developed cycling infrastructure, considered the best in Russia, thanks to which the bicycle has become a full-fledged and popular type of street transport used year-round. Its creation began in 2016, as part of a set of measures to increase the attractiveness of the city. Thanks to its cycling infrastructure, Almetyevsk has received the unofficial title of the cycling capital of Russia.

Industry
Almetyevsk is an important center of Russia's oil industry. Since 1960, the Druzhba pipeline has started in Almetyevsk. Pipelines to Nizhny Novgorod, Samara, and Subkhankulovo also start in this city. The city houses several oil equipment plants producing pipes, pumps and other oil tools. OAO Tatneft has offices here and is a major operator of the Romashkino Field in the Volga-Ural oil and gas region, also called the "Second Baku."

On 25 May 2017, Denis or Danis Nurgaliev (born 1 September 1956, Abdullyeno, Burayevsky Raion, Republic of Bashkortostan, USSR), who is the vice president and director of the Institute of Geology and Petroleum Technologies, led a Russian delegation from the Kazan Federal University (KFU) to Karamay and met with Zhao Wenquan, who was the secretary of the Karamay municipal committee, in which he proposed that Almetyevsk would begin a friendly relationship with Karamay. In October 2016, he had visited Karamay to begin a cooperation agreement with the Southwest Petroleum University and Xinjiang Branch Force New Technology Development Co Ltd.

Sports
Major sport enterprise in the city is an ice-hockey team "Neftyanik" presented in VHL league and sponsored by TatNeft. The team's main records are bronze medalists of Russian Championship Higher League (2002/2003 years ), gold medalists of Russian Championship Higher League (1997-1998 and 1999-2000), silver medalists of VHL 2010/2011 year, 2015/2016 Bratina Cup winners

Twin towns and sister cities 
 Balkanabat
 Karamay

References

Notes

Sources

External links
Official website of Almetyevsk 
Directory of organizations in Almetyevsk 

Cities and towns in Tatarstan
Bugulminsky Uyezd